Traffic and Weather is the fourth studio album by the American rock band Fountains of Wayne. It was released on Virgin Records in April 2007.

Background
While previous Fountains of Wayne albums saw lead singer Chris Collingwood and bassist Adam Schlesinger write songs separately then arrange them with the rest of the band, initial work on their fourth album saw them trying a new approach in which they wanted to get guitarist Jody Porter and drummer Brian Young more involved by jamming together at Bearsville Studios in Woodstock, New York. While it yielded many ideas, it didn't result in any finished songs. In the end, "Strapped for Cash" was the only song developed from the Bearsville sessions, as the band reverted to their usual methods. However, Collingwood was suffering from depression and alcoholism during the making of the album. As a result, he only penned three songs for it — "Fire in the Canyon", "Hotel Majestic" and "Seatbacks and Traytables" — while Schlesinger wrote the rest. (In a Lennon/McCartney-like arrangement, the writing of each individual song is still credited to both Collingwood and Schlesinger, even though both in fact write separately. However, for this album, the publishing credits tell the story — all songs are published by Schlesinger's company Vaguely Familiar Music, except for Collingwood's contributions, which are published by Collingwood's company Monkey Demon Music.)

According to an interview with New York all-news radio station WCBS, the band claimed the title of the album, which was mixed by Michael Brauer and John Holbrook, was inspired by the station's slogan promising "traffic and weather together on the eights".

Recording
Describing their process for the album, Schlesinger said, "We'll bring a song in, then Brian will come up with a feel for it, cut a basic track, then we'll spend a lot of time with Jody experimenting with different guitar parts. On this album more than any, you can really hear Jody's playing and the incredibly wide range that he's capable of."

The song "Someone to Love" includes backing vocals from former Smashing Pumpkins and Hole bassist Melissa Auf der Maur, "Fire in the Canyon" contains backing vocals from the Candy Butchers' Mike Viola, "Seatbacks and Traytables" features former Smashing Pumpkins guitarist James Iha, and "Strapped for Cash" features trumpeters Ronnie Buttacavoli and Scott Wendholt; the former trumpeter also plays on "Yolanda Hayes".

Reception 
The album was met with moderate commercial success and generally favorable reviews. It reached #97 on the Billboard 200 albums chart, and the song "I-95" was named #54 in Rolling Stone'ss list of the 100 Best Songs of 2007. Blender described the album as having "more witty tales of confused young people caught between destinations".

The song "Traffic & Weather" was used on KYW-TV/WPSG in Philadelphia during its morning traffic and weather segments. Likewise, several of WCBS's sister all-news stations used the song in promotions tongue-in-cheek to promote their own 'traffic and weather together' efforts.

Track listing

Personnel
 Chris Collingwood — lead vocals, rhythm guitar
 Adam Schlesinger — bass, keyboards, backing vocals
 Jody Porter — lead guitar, backing vocals
 Brian Young — drums

Quotes about the album
All quotes from Adam Schlesinger.

General
 "I don't think anybody is counting on us for another one [Stacy's Mom Standard Hit] of those. I hope not."
 "As usual, there are a lot of songs about transportation and travel."
 "Our goal is 12 units, then if we hit 13, it looks like a runaway success."
 "(Billy Corgan) was busy putting that other Smashing Pumpkins reunion together while we were working on this Smashing Pumpkins reunion on our record."

Songs
"Someone to Love": "a little bit 'Eleanor Rigby'-esque, in that it's about these two lonely people living in New York. It has a disco-y beat, which is something we don't do a lot of. Melissa Auf der Maur sings backing vocals, and that's the first female vocal we've had since Dominique Durand from Ivy on the first album."
"'92 Subaru": "It kind of sounds like The Doobie Brothers or Little Feat or something."
"Yolanda Hayes": "About a woman who works at the DMV"

Recording
"We had these grand ambitions to change our process, we went up to Woodstock and jammed, but in the end, only one thing from that session, 'Strapped for Cash,' turned into an actual song. For the rest of it, we went back to our usual method of writing on our own and bringing in a song to be arranged by everyone. Woodstock was good to get back together and loosen up, but I guess we're pretty set in our ways."

References

External links

Traffic and Weather at YouTube (streamed copy where licensed)

Fountains of Wayne albums
2007 albums
Virgin Records albums
Albums produced by Adam Schlesinger